The Most Important Person is an animation/live action series of 66 short subjects of important topics in the lives of children. They were produced in 1972 by Sutherland Learning Associates. From 1972 to 1975, these shorts were seen as part of CBS's Captain Kangaroo program.

The main characters were an ostrich named Fumble, the fur-covered Hairy, the loquacious Bird and two children, Mike and Nicola.

From 1975 to 1981, these shorts were later syndicated to local television stations, mostly independent stations that ran large amounts of non-CG animated cartoons and other children's programming. They also ran in the late 1970s on a few PBS stations running in-school programming. Some pre-1994 syndicated prints of The Underdog Show have also included Most Important Person shorts.

A later spin-off, The Kingdom of Could Be You, featuring the children from The Most Important Person,  was also produced by Sutherland Learning Associates.

References

External links

The Most Important Person at Big Cartoon Database
The Most Important Person at Toonarific
Pictures of The Most Important Person at Toonarific

Several episodes at The Museum of Classic Chicago Television

Personal development television series
1972 American television series debuts
1981 American television series endings
1970s American children's television series
1980s American children's television series
American children's education television series
American television series with live action and animation
Television series by CBS Studios
CBS original programming
First-run syndicated television programs in the United States